Bopitiya is a village in Sri Lanka. It is located within the western province. It is a beautiful village near Colombo. This village has a beautiful beach. Many of tourist are come to this village. Bopitiya junction is the city part in that village. 30000+ people live in there.

See also
List of towns in Central Province, Sri Lanka

External links

Populated places in Central Province, Sri Lanka